Beth Piatote is a Ni:mi:pu: (Nez Perce) scholar and author. She is a member of Chief Joseph’s Tribe and the Colville Confederated Tribes. Piatote currently works as an Associate Professor of Native American Studies in the department of Ethnic Studies at University of California, Berkeley. Piatote holds a PhD in Modern Thought and Literature from Stanford University.

Life 
In the mid 1990s, Piatote worked as a reporter with the Eugene Register-Guard. Her research interests include Ni:mi:pu: (Nez Perce) language and literature, Native American/Aboriginal literature and federal Indian law in the United States and Canada, as well as American literature and cultural studies, history and law. Piatote now resides in the San Francisco Bay Area with her two children.

Works

Academic writing 
 Domestic Subject: Gender, Citizenship and Law in Native American Literature (Yale University Press, 2013)

Short story collections 
 The Beadworkers (CounterPoint Press, 2019)

Articles 
 The News of the Day (2009, University of Nebraska Press) 
 Our (Someone Else's) Father: Articulation, Dysarticulation, and Indigenous Literary Traditions (2010, Kenyon University)
 Domestic Trials: Indian Rights and National Belonging in Works by E. Pauline Johnson and John M. Oskiso (2011, The Johns Hopkins University Press)
 The Indian/Agent Aporia (2013, University of Nebraska Press) 
 Indian Country: Between Native Claims and Modernist Desires (2017, University of Cambridge Press) 
 “Stories Were Everywhere” (2018, University of North Carolina University Press)

Awards 
 MLA Prize for Studies in Native American Literatures, Cultures, and Languages, 2012-13 (honorable mention for Domestic Subject: Gender, Citizenship and Law in Native American Literature)
 University of California Regents Junior Faculty Fellowship, 2012
 Ford Foundation Postdoctoral Fellowship, 2009-2010
 Hellman Family Faculty Fund Award, 2009
 Whiting Dissertation Fellowship in the Humanities, 2006–07
 Graduate Research Opportunity Grant, Stanford University, 2003
 Ford Foundation Predoctoral Fellowship, 2001–03

References 

Year of birth missing (living people)
Living people
Native American women academics
American women academics
Native American academics
Nez Perce people
20th-century Native Americans
20th-century Native American women
21st-century Native Americans
21st-century Native American women
Stanford University alumni
University of California, Berkeley faculty